The Provincial Formation is a geologic formation in Cuba. It preserves rudist fossils dating back to the Cenomanian period.

Fossil content 
 Caprinuloidea perfecta
 Coalcomana ramosa
 Tepeyacia corrugata
 Icthyosarcolites sp.
 Sabinia sp.

See also 
 List of fossiliferous stratigraphic units in Cuba

References

Further reading 
 
 A. Torre. 1960. Notas sobre rudistas [Notes about rudists]. Memorias de la Sociedad Cubana de Historia Natural 25(1):51-64

Geologic formations of Cuba
Cretaceous Cuba
Cenomanian Stage
Limestone formations
Shallow marine deposits
Formations